Operation Shah Euphrates was an operation by the Turkish military to relocate the tomb of Suleyman Shah in Syria conducted on 21/22 February 2015. The tomb, which was positioned inside Turkey's only foreign enclave,  had been surrounded by self proclaimed Islamic State in Iraq and the Levant (ISIL) forces for over 4 months. Due to the presence of ISIS, the exclaves garrison was recently raised from eleven Turkish soldiers to thirty eight.

Operation 
On the night of 21–22 February 2015, a Turkish military convoy including 600 Turkish troops, tanks and other armored vehicles numbering about 100 entered Syria to evacuate the tomb's 38 guards and relocate the remains. The operation was conducted through the border crossing of Kobani. According to Hasip Kaplan of the Peoples' Democratic Party (HDP), the Kurdish People's Defense Units (YPG) shall have been supporting the rescue.

Reactions 
Despite Interior Minister Efkan Ala was denying reports that the Turkish army had to flee from ISIS militants the party leaders of the Republican People's Party (CHP) and the Nationalist Movement Party (MHP), Kemal Kılıçdaroğlu and Devlet Bahçeli both condemned the fact that Turkish soldiers retreated from the tomb. The retreat from an exclave from Turkish sovereign territory was seen as a defeat. The tomb complex was destroyed to prevent its use by ISIS.

New location 
The tomb is now located in Turkish-controlled territory 200 meters inside Syria, 22 km (14 mi) west of Kobani and 5 km (3.1 mi) east of the Euphrates, less than 2 km (1.2 mi) southeast of the Turkish village of Esmesi (Esmeler or Esme or Eshme) that is in southernmost Birecik District. Prime Minister of Turkey at the time, Ahmet Davutoğlu said that later a new tomb will be constructed in Syrian territory.

References

2015 in Syria
Birecik District
Shah Euphrates
Shah Euphrates
2015 in Turkey
Syria–Turkey relations
Cross-border operations of Turkey into Syria
Military operations of the Syrian civil war involving the People's Protection Units